Halderberge is a municipality in the southern Netherlands.

Population centres 
Oudenbosch (population: 13,110)
Hoeven (6,560)
Oud Gastel (6,360)
Bosschenhoofd (2,180)
Stampersgat (1,330)

Topography

Dutch Topographic map of the municipality of Halderberge, June 2015

Transportation

International relations

Twin towns — Sister cities
Halderberge is twinned with:

Notable people 

 Jac. van Ginneken (1877 in Oudenbosch - 1945) a Dutch linguist, Jesuit priest and academic
 Marinus Jan Granpré Molière (1883 in Oudenbosch — 1972) a Dutch architect

 Gabriel Nuchelmans (1922 in Oud Gastel – 1996) a Dutch philosopher, focused on the philosophy of the Middle Ages
 Cretien van Campen (born 1963 in Oudenbosch) a Dutch author, editor and scientific researcher in social science and fine arts

Sport 
 Janus van Merrienboer (1894 in Oud en Nieuw Gastel – 1947) an archer, competed at the 1920 Summer Olympics
 Ad Tak (born 1953 in Nieuwe Gastel) a retired cyclist, competed at the 1976 Summer Olympics
 Digna Ketelaar (born 1967 in Bosschenhoofd) a former Dutch tennis player

Gallery

References

External links

Official website

 
Municipalities of North Brabant
Municipalities of the Netherlands established in 1997